"Ain't a Party" is a song by French house music producer and disc jockey (DJ) David Guetta and Dutch duo Glowinthedark, featuring vocals from Harrison Shaw. The song was released as the lead single from Guetta's compilation album Fuck Me I'm Famous – Ibiza Mix 2013. The song was written by Harrison who originally recorded on the project in February 2013 after meeting Chuckie who had introduced him to Glowinthedark, After receiving a rough instrumental from Albert Budhai. The track went on to become a massive success at Miami's Ultra Music Festival where Guetta first heard the track and signed the record and added additional production with Giorgio Tuinfort, Jean Baptiste, Albert Budhai, Abrigael Ramos, and with additional uncredited guitar performed by Pierre-Luc Rioux.

Track listing

Chart performance

Weekly charts

Release history

References

2013 singles
2013 songs
David Guetta songs
Songs written by David Guetta
Songs written by Giorgio Tuinfort
Songs written by Jean-Baptiste (songwriter)
Parlophone singles